is a Japanese seinen manga magazine published by Futabasha.

History
Monthly Action was launched on May 25, 2013, the anniversary of publisher Futabasha's founding. While typically categorized as seinen magazine (manga for young adult men), the magazine follows a philosophy of publishing "anything interesting", and does not strictly conform to a specific genre or target demographic.

Serializations

Current
 Holmes of Kyoto by Mai Mochizuki & Yamōchishizu (2015 – present)
 Miss Kobayashi's Dragon Maid by Coolkyousinnjya (2013 – present)
 Peter Grill and the Philosopher's Time by Daisuke Hiyama (2017 – present)
 Seishōnen Ashibe by Hiromi Morishita & Shouhei (2018 – present)
 Shikizakura by Hayato Aoki (2020 – present)
 Tsugumomo by Yoshikazu Hamada (2013 – present)
 Uchi no Maid ga Uzasugiru! by Kanko Nakamura (2016 – present)

Former
 ComaGoma Goma-chan by Hiromi Morishita (2017 – 2018)
 Crossing Time by Yoshimi Sato (2016 – 2021)
 Dreamin' Sun by Ichigo Takano (2015 – 2017)
 Hana & Hina After School by Milk Morinaga (2015 – 2016)
 I Had That Same Dream Again by Izumi Kirihara (2017 – 2018)
 I Want to Eat Your Pancreas by Izumi Kirihara (2016 – 2017)
 My Brother's Husband by Gengoroh Tagame (2014 – 2017)
 Nobunaga Teacher's Young Bride by Azure Konno (2017 – 2019)
 Orange by Ichigo Takano (2013 – 2017)
 Our Colors by Gengoroh Tagame (2018 – 2020)
 Over Drive Girl 1/6 by Öyster (2012 – 2015)
 Shōnen Ashibe: GO! GO! Goma-chan by Hiromi Morishita & Ogino Junko (2016 – 2017)

References

External links
 Official website
 

2013 establishments in Japan
Magazines established in 2013
Monthly manga magazines published in Japan
Seinen manga magazines